Wolf is a six-part 2018 Turkish-language miniseries starring Ahu Türkpençe, Serkan Çayoğlu, and Emir Benderlioğlu. The plot revolves around the lives of Turkey's Police Special Operation Teams, covering several years of Turkish history beginning in 2014. It was released on February 28, 2018 on Star TV.

Cast
 Ahu Türkpençe as Asena Tümer
 Serkan Çayoğlu as Kaya Ülgen
 Emir Benderlioğlu as Turan Kara
 Murat Arkın as Kemal Boratav
 Fırat Doğruloğlu as Behçet Orbay
 Mesut Akusta as İrfan Aladağ
 Ahmet Pınar as Barbaros Çepni
 Can Nergis as Tolga Erlik
 Ozan Agaç as Baran Harput
 Bedii Akın as Ömer Tunç
 Melis Hacic as Zeynep
 Gürol Tonbul as Turgut Atalay
 Tan Altay as Tan Altay
 Armağan Oğuz as Ayı Murat
 Özge Gürel as First Lieutenant Gökçe Demir

Release
Wolf was released on February 28, 2018 on Star TV.

References

External links
 
 

Turkish-language television shows
Television shows set in Turkey
2018 Turkish television series debuts